David Rodney Croudip (January 25, 1958 – October 10, 1988) was an American football defensive back. He played for the Los Angeles Rams, San Diego Chargers and the Atlanta Falcons of the NFL and the USFL's Los Angeles Express and Houston Gamblers. Croudip died on October 10, 1988 at age 30. It was later determined he had ingested a fatal dose of cocaine. His death would be the first of three to strike the Falcons organization in the span of two years. The next year, offensive tackle Ralph Norwood was killed in a one-car crash. Four weeks later, tight end Brad Beckman was killed in a separate automobile collision.

References

External links
Death of an N.F.L. Player: Questions Persist- New York Times, October 27, 1988

1958 births
1988 deaths
American football defensive backs
Los Angeles Rams players
San Diego Chargers players
Atlanta Falcons players
San Diego State Aztecs football players
Cocaine-related deaths in Georgia (U.S. state)
Players of American football from Indianapolis